The sphenopetrosal fissure (or sphenopetrosal suture) is the cranial suture between the sphenoid bone and the petrous portion of the temporal bone.

It is in the middle cranial fossa.

External links 

Skull